Lily Isabelle Owsley,  (born 10 December 1994) in Bristol, England is an English field hockey player who plays as a midfielder or forward for Dutch club hdm and the England and Great Britain national teams.

Club career

Owsley plays club hockey in the Dutch Hoofdklasse for hdm.
She has been playing hockey in the Women's England Hockey League Premier Division for Hampstead & Westminster.
and has also played for University of Birmingham

International career

She won gold competing for Great Britain at the 2016 Rio Olympics, where she scored GB's first goal of the tournament as well as the first goal in the Gold Medal final. She competed for England in the women's hockey tournament at the 2014 Commonwealth Games where she won a silver medal. She was selected for the 2018 Commonwealth Team but had to withdraw due to injury.

Owsley won Euro hockey gold with England in August 2015 at the Queen Elizabeth Olympic Park in Stratford, London. She scored the final goal to end full-time 2–2 with the Netherlands, then England won the penalty shoot out.

In January 2016, Owsley was named global FIH Rising Star of 2015.

In June 2021, it was announced that Owsley would be partaking in her second Olympic Games at Tokyo 2020, representing Great Britain in the Women's field hockey team.

Education
Lily was educated at Clifton College and The University of Birmingham.

References

External links
 

Profile on England Hockey
Profile on Great Britain Hockey

1994 births
Living people
Commonwealth Games silver medallists for England
English female field hockey players
Field hockey players at the 2014 Commonwealth Games
Field hockey players at the 2016 Summer Olympics
Field hockey players at the 2020 Summer Olympics
People educated at Clifton College
Olympic field hockey players of Great Britain
British female field hockey players
Medalists at the 2016 Summer Olympics
Olympic gold medallists for Great Britain
Olympic medalists in field hockey
Commonwealth Games medallists in field hockey
Members of the Order of the British Empire
Sportspeople from Bristol
Female field hockey forwards
Women's England Hockey League players
University of Birmingham Hockey Club players
Hampstead & Westminster Hockey Club players
Olympic bronze medallists for Great Britain
Medalists at the 2020 Summer Olympics
Medallists at the 2014 Commonwealth Games